Frank Mills Dobson (January 10, 1885 – December 1, 1956) was an American football, basketball, and baseball coach. He served as the head football coach at the University of Georgia (1909, with James Coulter), Clemson University (1910–1912), the University of Richmond (1913–1917, 1919–1933), the University of South Carolina (1918), the University of Maryland (1936–1939), and The Apprentice School (1940–1948), compiling a career record of 137–142–24. Dobson was also the head basketball coach at Clemson (1911–1913) and Richmond (1912–1917, 1919–1933) and the head baseball coach at Clemson (1911–1913) and Richmond (1915–1933).

Coaching career

Georgia Tech and Georgia
A native of Roanoke, Virginia, Dobson was an assistant under legendary Georgia Tech head coach John Heisman.

In 1909, Dobson moved to Georgia Tech's arch-rival, Georgia. There, the new head coach, James Coulter, had no prior coaching experience. Dobson was hired as a co-coach and added new trick plays in an attempt to energize the offense. Still the team finished with a record of 2–4–2.

Clemson
Dobson moved on to Clemson University for the 1910 season, where he coached not only football, but also basketball and baseball. His overall record with the Clemson football team was 11–12–1.

Richmond and South Carolina
Dobson then moved to the University of Richmond, where he was athletic director and football, baseball, and basketball coach from 1913 to 1933, with one exception: in the abbreviated postwar season of 1918, rather than coaching the Richmond football team, he took over the South Carolina Gamecocks and led them to a record of 2–1–1. Dobson's overall football record at Richmond was 79–78–18, his baseball record was 153–112, and his basketball record was 153–106. Dobson was posthumously elected to the University of Richmond Athletic Hall of Fame in 1978.

Maryland
In 1935, Dobson became an assistant at Maryland under head coach Jack Faber. The following season, he was promoted to head coach and served in that position through 1939. Dobson amassed an 18–21 record at Maryland.

Apprentice
Dobson finished his career as the 11th head football coach at The Apprentice School in Newport News, Virginia and he held that position for nine seasons, from 1940 until 1948. His coaching record at Apprentice was 25–26–2. A highlight at Apprentice was a 7–6 upset of the Virginia in 1943.

Death
Dobson died on December 1, 1956, in Carlisle, Indiana. He was found dead in bed after suffering a coronary occlusion.

Head coaching record

Football

See also
 List of college football coaches with 100 losses
 List of college football coaches with 20 ties

References

External links
 
 

1885 births
1956 deaths
The Apprentice Builders football coaches
Clemson Tigers athletic directors
Clemson Tigers baseball coaches
Clemson Tigers football coaches
Clemson Tigers men's basketball coaches
College men's basketball head coaches in the United States
Georgia Bulldogs football coaches
Georgia Tech Yellow Jackets football coaches
Maryland Terrapins football coaches
Richmond Spiders athletic directors
Richmond Spiders baseball coaches
Richmond Spiders football coaches
Richmond Spiders men's basketball coaches
Richmond Spiders track and field coaches
Rose–Hulman Fightin' Engineers football coaches
South Carolina Gamecocks athletic directors
South Carolina Gamecocks football coaches
Sportspeople from Philadelphia
Sportspeople from Roanoke, Virginia
Baseball coaches from Virginia
Basketball coaches from Virginia